Below is a list of notable footballers who have played for MC Alger. Generally, this means players that have played 100 or more league matches for the club. However, some players who have played fewer matches are also included; this includes players that have had considerable success either at other clubs or at international level, as well as players who are well remembered by the supporters for particular reasons.

Players are listed in alphabetical order according to the date of their first-team official debut for the club. Appearances and goals are for first-team competitive matches only. Substitute appearances included. Statistics accurate as of 26 May 2019.

List of MC Alger players

Nationalities are indicated by the corresponding FIFA country code.

List of All-time appearances
This List of All-time appearances for MC Alger contains football players who have played for MC Alger and have managed to accrue 100 or more appearances.

Bold Still playing competitive football in MC Alger.

1 Includes the Super Cup and League Cup.
2 Includes the Cup Winners' Cup, CAF Cup, Confederation Cup and Champions League.
3 Includes the Champions League and UAFA Club Cup.

List of leading goalscorers
Bold Still playing competitive football in MC Alger.

Position key:
GK – Goalkeeper;
DF – Defender;
MF – Midfielder;
FW – Forward

1 Includes the Super Cup.
2 Includes the Confederation Cup and Champions League.
3 Includes the UAFA Club Cup.

Players from MC Alger to Europe

Award winners
(Whilst playing for MC Alger)

Top goalscorers in Algerian Ligue 1
  Hassan Tahir (20 goals) – 1971–72
  Abdeslam Bousri (12 goals) – 1972–73
  Omar Betrouni (17 goals) – 1973–74
  Abdeslam Bousri (14 goals) – 1977–78
  Abdeslam Bousri (11 goals) – 1978–79
  Nasser Bouiche (19 goals) – 1979–80
  Abdeslam Bousri (16 goals) – 1981–82
  Abdeslam Bousri (17 goals) – 1982–83
  Hadj Bouguèche (17 goals) – 2009–10
  Moustapha Djallit (14 goals) – 2012–13

Algerian professional football awards Footballer of the Year
  Abderahmane Hachoud – 2013–14

Algerian professional football awards Young Player of the Year 
  Hamza Koudri – 2007–08
  Brahim Boudebouda – 2010–11
  Toufik Zeghdane – 2013–14

Algerian professional football awards Goalkeeper of the Year
  Lamine Zemmamouche – 2010–11
  Faouzi Chaouchi – 2015–16

Notes

References

External links 

Players
 
MC Alger
MC Alger
Association football player non-biographical articles